Diocese of Kazan and Tatarstan is an eparchy of the Russian Orthodox Church on the administrative boundaries of Kazan, Naberezhnye Chelny in the Republic of Tatarstan.

History
Kazan Diocese of the Russian Orthodox Church was established April 3, 1555, three years after the conquest of the Kazan Khanate. The first ruling bishop was the abbot of the monastery of Tver Selizharovo Guri, who went to Kazan with archimandrites Varsonofy and Germany.

The most important events in the life of the Kazan diocese were acquiring in 1579 the Kazan Icon of the Mother of God of Kazan participation in the militia of Minin and Pozharsky with the blessing of Patriarch Hermogenes, a former Metropolitan of Kazan and the glorification of the Kazan Icon of the Mother of God.

During 1741 the missionaries were able to baptize the entire province of 9159 people, Tatars and Bashkirs were among these, only 143 (see A. Chuloshnikov). Anyway, missionary work in the Kazan region was in time rather weak character and the activities of the Kazan Theological Academy was limited mainly to the deeper study of the linguistic and cultural aspects of life of the peoples of the East.

In the beginning of the 19th century it was discovered Kazan branch of the Bible Society to translate the scriptures into local languages. In 1814, the Tatar language was transferred to the New Testament, and in 1819 - the first book of the Old Testament (Genesis). In 1847 the Kazan Theological Academy opens translation committee in 1854 - three missionary department. In support of missionary education October 4, 1867 was established Orthodox Brotherhood of St. Gury.

According to figures cited by Professor NP Zagoskin [1], at the end of the 19th century in Kazan "number 4 of the Cathedral, 28 parish churches, two churches, attributed to the monasteries, churches 3 military and 22 domestic churches, only 59 Orthodox churches" and 7 convents in the city, of which so far passed four dioceses, Fedorov [2] completely destroyed in the 20th century (in his place NCC Kazan) Holy Transfiguration Monastery (preserved fraternal body, fence 19th century, the base of the Transfiguration Cathedral) and Resurrection [3] (was also called the New Jerusalem, is a temple of the 18th century) do not apply.

June 11, 1993 from the Kazan diocese was separated Yoshkar-Ola diocese within the Republic of Mari El.

June 6, 2012 were allocated separate Almetyevsk and Chistopolskaya diocese with their inclusion and the Kazan diocese in the newly established Archdiocese of Tatarstan, and then in the Kazan diocese left the north-eastern half of Tatarstan.

See also 

 Russian Orthodox Church
 Eparchies and Metropolitanates of the Russian Orthodox Church

Eparchies of the Russian Orthodox Church